Keith Randall Hornsby (born January 30, 1992) is an American professional basketball player for Nanterre 92 of the LNB Pro A. He played college basketball for UNC Asheville and LSU.

High school career
Hornsby began his prep career at Hampton Roads Academy before transferring to Oak Hill Academy. As a senior, he averaged 11.4 points, two assists and three rebounds and led the Warriors in three-point shooting at 50.4 percent, helping them finish with a 29–4 overall record and to be ranked fourth nationally.

College career
Hornsby played his first two years of college basketball at UNC Asheville where he averaged 15.0 points, 4.2 rebounds and 3.1 assists per game, while shooting 37.9 percent from three-point range as a sophomore. As a junior, he transferred to LSU, starting in 52 of 53 games and finished with averages of 13.3 points, 3.7 rebounds and 1.9 assists in 33.6 minutes. In his senior season, he averaged 13.1 points, second on the team to Ben Simmons, before suffering a season-ending abdominal injury that required surgery.

Professional career

Texas Legends (2016–2019)
After going undrafted in the 2016 NBA draft, Hornsby signed with the Dallas Mavericks on July 27, 2016,  but was waived on October 22 after appearing in five preseason games. On October 30, 2016, Hornsby was selected by the Texas Legends with the ninth overall pick in the 2016 NBA Development League Draft. In his first season, he averaged 4.5 points, 2.0 rebounds, and 1.0 assist per game. Hornsby averaged 10.1 points, 3.0 rebounds, 1.6 assists, and 1.2 steals per game in the 2017–18 season. In the 2018–19 NBA G League season, Hornsby led the league in three-point field goal percentage at 48.5%, while averaging 12.3 points, 2.7 assists, 1.5 rebounds and 1.0 steals per game.

Toruń (2019–2020)
On September 2, 2019, after three years in the G League, Hornsby went overseas for the first time in his career and signed with Polish club Twarde Pierniki Toruń. He averaged 16 points and 3 assists per game.

EWE Baskets Oldenburg (2020–2021)
On July 4, 2020, he signed with EWE Baskets Oldenburg of the Basketball Bundesliga (BBL).

Metropolitans 92 (2021–2022)
On July 7, 2021, he signed a one-year deal with the French team Metropolitans 92 of the LNB Pro A.

Nanterre 92 (2022–present)
On July 29, 2022, he has signed with Nanterre 92 of the LNB Pro A.

Personal life
He is the son of Grammy-winning musician Bruce Hornsby (singer of major 1980s hits Mandolin Rain and The Way It Is) and Kathy Hornsby and has a twin brother named Russell. He graduated with a degree in communication studies.

References

External links
LSU Tigers bio
UNC Asheville Bulldogs bio
RealGM profile
Sports-Reference profile

1992 births
Living people
American expatriate basketball people in Poland
American men's basketball players
Basketball players from Virginia
LSU Tigers basketball players
Metropolitans 92 players
Nanterre 92 players
Shooting guards
Sportspeople from Williamsburg, Virginia
Texas Legends players
Twarde Pierniki Toruń players
UNC Asheville Bulldogs men's basketball players